Abd al-Haqq ibn Ismail al-Badisi (died after 1322) was a Moroccan biographer, author of  (The exalted resolve and the subtle object of the naming of the venerable inhabitants of the Rif), a book about the life of 48 Sufi saints of the Rif.

References 

13th-century Moroccan writers
14th-century Moroccan writers
14th-century deaths
Year of birth missing

Year of death unknown
People from Badis